The 2023 Appalachian State Mountaineers football team will represent Appalachian State University during the 2023 NCAA Division I FBS football season. The Mountaineers are led by fourth-year head coach Shawn Clark. Appalachian State plays their home games at Kidd Brewer Stadium on the school's Boone, North Carolina, campus, and compete as a member of the East Division of the Sun Belt Conference.

Previous season

The Mountaineers finished the 2022 season 6–6, 3–5 in Sun Belt play to finish in fith place in the East Division.

Offseason

Coaching changes
On November 28, 2022, defensive coordinator Dale Jones left the program.

On January 13, 2023, the Mountaineers hired Scot Sloan to be their defensive coordinator.

Schedule
The football schedule was announced February 24, 2023.

References

Appalachian State
Appalachian State Mountaineers football seasons
Appalachian State Mountaineers football